Robert Pooley or Poley may refer to:

Robert Henry Pooley (1878–1954), Canadian lawyer and politician
Robert Poley or Pooley (fl. 1568–1602), English spy
Robert Pooley (businessman), of Pooley Sword
Robert Poley (English MP) (c. 1600–1627), MP for Queenborough in 1624 and 1626
Robert Pooley (Irish MP), MP for Castlemartyr in 1692

See also
 Robert Poole (disambiguation)